Willington Dene Viaduct carries the Tyne and Wear Metro railway over the Wallsend Burn between Wallsend and Howdon, Tyne and Wear.  Designed by architects John and Benjamin Green, it was originally built in the late 1830s for the Newcastle & North Shields Railway.  It is a Grade II listed building.

When originally built the viaducts were made of laminated timber construction on the Wiebeking system supported on tall stone pillars and cost £25,000. Each arch was made from 14 layers of  timbers held together by trenails and built by Messrs. Robson. A paper on the viaducts's design won Benjamin Green a silver Telford Medal from the Institution of Civil Engineers in 1841.

The viaduct was rebuilt in iron between 1867 and 1869 by the Weardale Iron & Coal Company to the designs of engineer Thomas Elliot Harrison, preserving the bridge's original shape and form. It now carries the Tyne and Wear Metro rapid transport system between Newcastle and North Shields.

See also
 Ouseburn Viaduct

References

Railway bridges in Tyne and Wear
Grade II listed buildings in Tyne and Wear
John and Benjamin Green buildings and structures